Popigay may refer to:
Popigay (river), Russia
Popigai impact structure, Russia
Popigay (rural locality), a settlement in Krasnoyarsk Krai, Russia